Zeffie Agnes Lydia Tilbury (20 November 1863 – 24 July 1950) was an English-American actress.

Early years
Born in Paddington, Middlesex, England, Tilbury was the only child of the variety performer Lydia Thompson and John Christian Tilbury, a riding-master and "fashionable 'man about town'" from a comfortably wealthy background, his grandfather, of the Tilbury family firm of London coachbuilders, having created the Tilbury carriage. Her father died aged 26 in 1864; having borrowed an inexperienced horse, "All Fours", to participate in the South Essex Steeplechase at Brentwood, Essex, he was crushed by the horse when it failed to clear a fence and rolled on him. Although he didn't appear badly injured, his skull was fractured and he had suffered severe internal injuries, which caused his death the next day.

Career

Tilbury was known first on the London stage and on Broadway in New York City. In 1881, she debuted on stage in Nine Points of the Law at the Theatre Royal, Brighton, England.

She is today best known for playing wise or evil older characters in films, such as the distinguished lady gambler at dinner with Garbo in The Single Standard, as the pitiful Grandma Joad in The Grapes of Wrath and Grandma Lester in Tobacco Road.

She appeared in over 70 films. Her earliest surviving silent film is the Valentino / Nazimova 1921 production of Camille. Tilbury is probably best remembered as the old woman in the 1936 Hal Roach Our Gang comedy Second Childhood. She is befriended by Spanky and his friends on her birthday and, as a result, is transformed from a lonely, disagreeable recluse to a happy and loving carefree soul. In the same year she also portrayed the Gypsy Queen in the Laurel and Hardy film The Bohemian Girl.

Personal life
 
Tilbury was married twice. First to Arthur Frederick Lewis in June 1887, and later to L.E. Woodthorpe in 1904, who died on 8 April 1915.

Death
She died in Los Angeles, California in 1950 at the age of 86. Her grave is located at Chapel of the Pines Crematory.

Filmography

References

External links

 
 
 
 
 Zeffie Tilbury portrait at NYP Library
 signed photograph(archived)

English film actresses
1864 births
1950 deaths
People from Paddington
Actresses from London
English stage actresses
20th-century English actresses
British expatriate actresses in the United States